These are the official results of the Men's Discus Throw event at the 1995 World Championships in Gothenburg, Sweden. There were a total number of 43 participating athletes, with the final held on Friday August 11, 1995.

Medalists

Schedule
All times are Central European Time (UTC+1)

Qualification
 Held on Wednesday 1995-08-09

Final

See also
 1994 Men's European Championships Discus Throw
 1996 Men's Olympic Discus Throw

References
 Results

D
Discus throw at the World Athletics Championships